The following is a list of medal winners at the Netball World Cup.

1963

1967

1971

1975

1979

1983

1987

1991

1995

1999

2003

2007

2011

2015

2019

References

 
 
Lists of netball players
Medalists in netball